forfiles is a computer software utility for Microsoft Windows, which selects files and runs a command on them.  File selection criteria include name and last modified date.  The command specifier supports some special syntax options.  It can be used directly on the command-line, or in batch files or other scripts.

The forfiles command was originally provided as an add-on, in the Windows 98, Windows NT and Windows 2000 Resource Kits.  It became a standard utility with Windows Vista, as part of the new management features.

Usage
The forfiles command has several command-line switches.  If no switches or parameters given, it outputs the name of every file in the current directory.

Switches

Command syntax 
The command string is executed as given, except as noted below.

Sequences of the form , where "0x" is literal, and "FF" represents any two-digit hexadecimal number, are replaced with the corresponding single-byte value.  This can be used to embed non-printing ASCII characters, or extended ASCII characters.

The sequence  is replaced with a literal quotation mark .

Several variables are provided, to be used in the command as placeholders for the values from each file.  Variables are technically not required, but must be used if the command is to vary for each file.

Date syntax 
The date switch (/D) selects files based on their last modified date, given a date argument.

The date argument can be given as a literal date, in MM/DD/YYYY format (other date formats are not accepted).  Alternatively, the date argument can be given as a number, in which case it is taken to mean an age in days (i.e., the day date days before the present date).

If the date argument begins with a minus (-), only files modified on or before the given date are selected (older file / modified earlier).  Otherwise, only files modified on or after the given date are selected (younger files / modified later).  An explicit plus (+) may be given, but is the default.  Note that both modes select files on the given date.  There is no way to select files only on a given date (without also either before or after).

Examples 
The following command selects all log files (*.LOG) in the Windows directory 30 days or older, and lists them with their date.
C:\>FORFILES /P C:\Windows /M *.LOG /D -30 /C "CMD /C ECHO @FDATE @FILE"
6/12/2015 "iis7.log"
5/28/2015 "msxml4-KB954430-enu.LOG"
5/28/2015 "msxml4-KB973688-enu.LOG"
5/26/2015 "setuperr.log"
The following command would delete the same files.
C:\>FORFILES /P C:\Windows /M *.LOG /D -30 /C "CMD /C DEL @PATH"

See also 
 cmd.exe – The program implementing the Windows command-line interpreter
 Foreach loop – The FOR and FORFILES commands both implement a for-each loop
 find (Unix) – Unix command that finds files by attribute, similar to forfiles
 find (Windows) – DOS and Windows command that finds text matching a pattern
 grep – Unix command that finds text matching a pattern, similar to Windows find

References 
 .

External links

forfiles | Microsoft Docs

Windows Vista
Utility software
Command-line software
Windows administration